The 2010 SEABA Championship for Women is the qualifying tournament for Southeast Asia Basketball Association at the 2011 FIBA Asia Championship for Women. The tournament was held in Manila, Philippines from October 24 to October 29.

The Philippines swept all of their assignments en route to their maiden championship title and avenged their loss to the defending champions Thailand at the 2007 SEABA Championship for Women.

Elimination round

Round robin

Bronze-medal match

Gold-medal match

Final standings

Awards

References

2010
International women's basketball competitions hosted by the Philippines
2010 in women's basketball
2010–11 in Asian basketball
2010–11 in Philippine basketball
2010–11 in Malaysian basketball
2010–11 in Indonesian basketball
2010–11 in Singaporean basketball
2010–11 in Thai basketball
Bask